Amaurys Raúl Valle Mencia (born 18 January 1990) is a Cuban track and field athlete who competes in the 400 metres hurdles. His personal best for the event is 49.22 seconds, set in 2012.

Born in Sancti Spíritus, Valle emerged through the younger age category events, starting with a bronze medal at the 2007 World Youth Championships in Athletics, and then another bronze at the 2008 World Junior Championships in Athletics with a national junior record of 49.56 seconds. He competed sparingly in 2009 and 2010, but returned to the international scene a year later.

He won the 400 m hurdles at the 2011 ALBA Games and was also part of Cuba's silver medal-winning 4×400 metres relay team. He was chosen to compete for Cuba at the 2011 Pan American Games and although he was eliminated in the hurdles, he helped the Cuban relay team reach the final, where it won the gold medal after Valle was swapped for fellow hurdler Omar Cisneros. Valle beat Cisneros at the 2012 IAAF Centenary meet in Havana, setting a personal best of 49.22 seconds to finally improve upon his time from 2008. This gained him the qualifying standard for the 2012 London Olympics and he was later selected for the Cuban Olympic team. He placed 1st in the 1st Heat but was eliminated in the Semi-Finals of the 400m Male Hurdles. He dipped under fifty seconds again at the 2012 Ibero-American Championships in Athletics, where his run was enough for a silver medal behind Puerto Rico's Eric Alejandro.

Personal bests
400 m: 47.12 s –  La Habana, 8 June 2013
400 m hurdles: 49.19 s –  London, 3 August 2012

Achievements

1: Competed only in the heat.

References

External links

Sports reference biography

Living people
1990 births
Cuban male hurdlers
Athletes (track and field) at the 2011 Pan American Games
People from Sancti Spíritus
Athletes (track and field) at the 2012 Summer Olympics
Olympic athletes of Cuba
Pan American Games gold medalists for Cuba
Pan American Games medalists in athletics (track and field)
Medalists at the 2011 Pan American Games